The Finlandia hymn refers to a serene hymn-like section of the patriotic symphonic poem Finlandia, written in 1899 and 1900 by the Finnish composer Jean Sibelius. It was later re-worked by the composer into a stand-alone piece. With words written in 1940 by Veikko Antero Koskenniemi, it is one of the most important national songs of Finland. Although not the official national anthem of Finland, it has been continuously proposed as such.

Other major uses of the tune include several Christian hymns and other national songs.

Finnish national song
After the success of the full-length symphonic poem (most of which consists of rousing and turbulent passages, evoking the national struggle of the Finnish people), Sibelius published a stand-alone version of the hymn as the last of twelve numbers in his Masonic Ritual Music, Op. 113, with a text by opera singer Wäinö Sola. The version usually heard today has lyrics written by Veikko Antero Koskenniemi and was first performed in 1941. Sibelius himself arranged the hymn for choral performances. Today, during modern performances of Finlandia in its entirety, a choir is sometimes involved, singing the Finnish lyrics with the hymn section.

The Finlandia hymn is often proposed as an official national song or anthem of Finland.

International anthem

In 1934, Lloyd Stone wrote "This is my song", to the Finlandia tune, as an international song of peace. An expanded version with Christian themes by a later author appears in many hymnals.

Conductor Leopold Stokowski proposed using the melody for a worldwide anthem.

Christian hymns

Other words commonly set to the tune include some Christian hymns. Among those in widespread use across English-speaking denominations are "Be still, my soul" and "We rest on Thee, our shield and our defender".

"Be still, my soul"
The Christian hymn "Be still, my soul", written in German ("Stille meine Wille, dein Jesus hilft siegen") in 1752 by the Lutheran hymnwriter Catharina von Schlegel (1697–1768) and translated into English in 1855 by Jane Laurie Borthwick (1813–1897), is usually sung to this tune. It begins:

"We rest on Thee"
The hymn "We rest on Thee", written by Edith G. Cherry around 1895, is also commonly sung to the tune. Its first verse is:

Other uses
The tune was adopted for Biafra's national anthem, Land of the Rising Sun, during its attempted secession from Nigeria in the late 1960s.

On a smaller scale it also serves as the tune for the songs of various colleges and schools.

References

External links
 thisisFINLAND: Facts & stats – the national anthem

Compositions by Jean Sibelius
Hymn tunes
1900 compositions
Songs about Finland

de:Finlandia#Die „Finlandia-Hymne“
es:Finlandia (Sibelius)#El Himno "Finlandia"
eu:Finlandia (Sibelius)#"Finlandia" ereserkia
fr:Finlandia (poème symphonique)#Versions chantées
ja:フィンランディア#フィンランディア賛歌